AZ1, AZ-1, AZ.1, or variation, may refer to:

 Autozam AZ-1, a Kei-car sports car manufactured by Mazda under the Autozam brand
 Casio AZ-1, a keytar polyphonic MIDI keyboard manufactured by Casio
 Sky-Watcher AZ1, an alt-azimuth telescope mount made by Sky-Watcher
 Sony HDR-AZ1, one of the Sony Action Cams

See also

 AZ (disambiguation)
 AZI (disambiguation)
 AZL (disambiguation)
 1AZ (disambiguation)